is a passenger railway station located in Nakahara-ku, Kawasaki, Kanagawa Prefecture, Japan, operated by the East Japan Railway Company (JR East).

Lines
Mukaigawara Station is served by the Nambu Line.

Station layout
The station consists of two opposed side platforms serving two tracks, connected by a footbridge. The station is attended.

Platforms

History 
Mukaigawara Station opened as a station on the Nambu Railway on 9 March 1927. It was renamed  on 5 August 1940. Along with nationalization of Nambu Railway, the station reverted to its original name under the Japanese Government Railway Nambu Line on 1 April 1944, and became part of the  Japan National Railways (JNR) system from 1946. Freight operations were discontinued from 1973. Along with privatization and division of JNR, JR East started operating the station on 1 April 1987.

Lines

Passenger statistics
In fiscal 2019, the station was used by an average of 12,385 passengers daily (boarding passengers only).

The passenger figures (boarding passengers only) for previous years are as shown below.

Surrounding area
 NEC Tamagawa Plant (NEC Tamagawa Renaissance City)
Kawasaki Municipal Tachibana High School

See also
 List of railway stations in Japan

References

External links

  

Railway stations in Kanagawa Prefecture
Railway stations in Japan opened in 1927
Railway stations in Kawasaki, Kanagawa